Bloomberry Resorts Corp. is a holding company in the Philippines registered with the Securities and Exchange Commission engaged in amusement, tourist facilities, gaming, and hotel businesses. It was incorporated on May 3, 1999 and led by Enrique Razon.

Background 
The company's former name was Active Alliance, Incorporated. It was listed on the Philippine Stock Exchange on  Oct 17, 2000. In 2013 it was included in the PSE Composite Index and was removed from the list and replaced with Security Bank three years later. It was included again on the index on February 18, 2019.

Bloomberry operates the Solaire Resort and Casino, the company's flagship business, and Jeju Sun Hotel & Casino in Jeju Island, South Korea. In February 2019, the company secured loans for the construction of its second hotel and gaming resort called Solaire North in Quezon City, set to open in 2022.

Subsidiaries 
Among its subsidiaries are Sureste Properties, Inc. and Bloomberry Resorts and Hotels, Inc (BRHI), which holds the hotel and gaming licenses for Solaire Resort and Casino. Another subsidiary formed in 2019, Bloomberry Cruise Terminal, Inc. (BCTI), manages and operates BRC's cruise terminal business, including the newly constructed Ilocos Cruise Port in Salomague, Ilocos Sur; and Solaire Cruise Center and Yacht Harbor, a planned cruise terminal adjacent to the Solaire Manila property in Entertainment City.

In South Korea, subsidiary Golden & Luxury Co., Ltd, operates Jeju Sun Hotel & Casino and Muui Agricultural Corporation is the owner of real estate property in Muui island.

References 

Holding companies of the Philippines
Conglomerate companies of the Philippines
Companies listed on the Philippine Stock Exchange
Companies established in 1993
Companies based in Parañaque
1993 establishments in the Philippines